Oduor is a surname. Notable people with the surname include:

Clarke Oduor (born 1999), Kenyan footballer
Michael Oduor (born 1962), Kenyan judoka
Mo Oduor (born 1978), Kenyan footballer
Okwiri Oduor (born 1988/1989), Kenyan writer
Rosemary Oduor (born  1967), Kenyan electrical engineer and corporate executive

Surnames of African origin